The 2023 Kansas City Current season is the team's third season as a professional women's soccer team. The Current plays in the National Women's Soccer League, the top tier of women's soccer in the United States.

Background 
In January 2023, the club announced Kansas City Chiefs quarterback Patrick Mahomes as a new club co-owner.

During the 2023 NWSL Draft, the Current traded Lynn Wiliams to NJ/NY Gotham FC for the second overall pick—where they selected Duke forward Michelle Cooper. The Current's remaining seven picks included Alexa Spaanstra, Gabrielle Robinson, Jordan Silkowitz, Mykiaa Minniss, Ella Shamburger, Rylan Childers, and Ashley Orkus.

Stadium and facilities 
The team currently plays at Children's Mercy Park in Kansas City, Kansas, sharing it with Sporting Kansas City of Major League Soccer. In October 2021, the team announced plans to build its own 11,500-capacity venue on the Berkley Riverfront of Kansas City, which is expected to open in late 2023 or early 2024, in time for the 2024 NWSL regular season.

Beginning in June 2022, the Current kicked off at their own dedicated practice facility in Riverside, Missouri. It is the first purpose-built facility for an NWSL team.

Team

Technical staff

Squad

Competitions

Challenge Cup

Transactions

2023 NWSL Expansion Draft

References 

2023 National Women's Soccer League season
American soccer clubs 2022 season
Kansas City Current
Kansas City Current seasons
2023 in sports in Kansas